St. Clair–Old Weston GO Station (also referred to as St. Clair) is a planned commuter train station in Toronto, Ontario, Canada. It will be an infill station on the Kitchener line of GO Transit  located between Bloor GO station and the future Mount Dennis station. The station is one of five GO stations to be built as part of the SmartTrack Stations Program to adapt regional commuter service for urban public transit. A contract to construct the station will be awarded in 2022 with an expected completion in 2026.

Description
The station will be located on the west side of Union Street, north of St. Clair Avenue West between Weston Road and Old Weston Road. The station's main building will be located at the east side of the railway right-of-way at the south end with a second station building at the north end. A TTC bus loop will be located between the two buildings, and will have a Wheel-Trans bay. All three will be accessed from Union Street. A tunnel, accessible by stairs and elevators, will run under the tracks from each of the two station buildings to access the island platform and two side platforms. One side platform is between two tracks; the other is on the west side of the right-of-way. There will two pedestrian paths at each end of the side platform along the west side of the right-of-way; the north-end path leads from Weston Road and Gunns Road while the south end path leads from Weston Road and St. Clair Avenue.

There are multiple railway tracks passing through the station site. The eastern-most track is used by CP Rail and has no platform. The station design allows for an additional CP Rail track to be added on the east side of the right-of-way.

Construction
Along with the station construction, there are three related road changes. These would be:
 St. Clair Avenue between Weston Road and Old Weston Road will be widened from four to six lanes. The present bridge will be demolished, and a wider replacement bridge will be built before constructing the station. The new bridge underpass will not be sufficiently wide to accommodate a streetcar stop with platforms given the two extra lanes. Land for street widening will be taken from the south side of the street because of townhouses on the northwest side of the bridge and Haydon House on the northeast side. Streetcar tracks will need to be shifted.
 Davenport Road will be extended north-west from Old Weston Road, to cross St. Clair Avenue on an overpass parallel to the railway overpass, turning north to connect with Union Street. Ramps and stairs would be provided for pedestrians from both sides of St. Clair Avenue to access Davenport Road and the station.
 Gunns Road will be extended east crossing Weston Road, passing under the railway right-of-way to end at Union Street.

The station site will be built on underutilized industrial land. The road changes and the station construction will be part of a single construction contract to be awarded to one contractor.

During planning, Metrolinx had to take two heritage structures into account:
 Heydon House, on the northwest corner of St. Clair Avenue and Old Weston Road, will be preserved undisturbed. The building was built circa 1890 and was originally a hotel frequented by railway workers.
 The railway bridge over St. Clair Avenue will be demolished. Before demolition, Metrolinx will photo-document the structure for commemorative purposes. Some artifacts from the bridge may be preserved.

TTC connections
TTC routes that may serve the new station are:
 41 Keele
 89 Weston
 127 Davenport
 168 Symington
 512 St. Clair 
 941 Keele Express
 989 Weston Express

The nearest streetcar stops to the station will be at Weston Road (via a pedestrian path along the north side of St. Clair Avenue) and Old Weston Road (via Townsley Street). Some local bus routes will be rerouted through to the bus loop at the station.

References

External links
 Kitchener GO Expansion – Metrolinx

Future GO Transit railway stations
Proposed railway stations in Canada
Transport in Toronto